Sammie Lee Rogers (born May 30, 1970) is a former American football linebacker who played in the National Football League for the Buffalo Bills, San Diego Chargers, and Atlanta Falcons. He was drafted by the Bills in the second round of the 1994 NFL Draft out of the University of Colorado. His son, Armani, played college football at UNLV and Ohio before joining the Washington Commanders as a undrafted free agent in 2022.

References

1970 births
Living people
St. Mary's Preparatory alumni
American football linebackers
Colorado Buffaloes football players
Buffalo Bills players
San Diego Chargers players
Atlanta Falcons players
Sportspeople from Pontiac, Michigan
Players of American football from Michigan